Oncideres stillata is a species of beetle in the family Cerambycidae. It was described by Per Olof Christopher Aurivillius in 1904 and is known from Bolivia.

References

stillata
Beetles described in 1904